Nakiea Jovon Miller (born May 15, 1979) is a retired American professional basketball player who last played for the Dunkin Raptors in the Thailand Basketball League. He previously played in the ASEAN Basketball League for Satria Muda Pertamina Jakarta, Westports Malaysia Dragons, Philippine Patriots and Pilipinas MX3 Kings, and during his time there, Miller scored over 1,000 points.  He has also played professionally in Argentina, Belgium, Canada, Chile, Colombia (Patriotas), Dominican Rep., France, Indonesia, Iraq (Al Kahraba), Lebanon (Bejjeh), Malaysia (KL Dragons), Mexico (La Ola Roja del Distrito Federal), Poland, Uruguay (Larre Borges, Goes, Montevideo BC and Maldonado), Venezuela (Toros), Dominican Republic (La Mattica), Philippines (Philippine Patriots) and Kosovo (Besa).

High school career
Miller attended Bunnell High School in Stratford, Connecticut, and was named to the New Haven Register All-Area boys basketball team during 1996–1997 season.

College career
Miller played basketball at Iona College, where he played center. In 2001 became the all-time blocked shots leader, and is currently the record holder with 249. In 2001 he was named the Metro Atlantic Athletic Conference postseason tournament MVP.

College career statistics
Cited from Iona College Athletics official site

Iona Gaels individual career records

References

External links
 Asia-basket.com profile

1979 births
Living people
American men's basketball players
Iona Gaels men's basketball players